Lani Aisida (born November 17, 1984) is a Nigerian screenwriter and producer. Among the shows and films he's written for are Oga! Pastor, Skinny Girl in Transit, and Just Not Married, with the last earning him a nomination for a Best of Nollywood Award for Best Screenplay. He has been nicknamed the "King of Web Series" for writing popular webs series.

Life and career

Born in Lagos State, Aisida studied Mathematics and Statistics at the University of Lagos and received a Bachelor of Science from Oxford Brookes University. He is also a former accountant.

Aisida developed a passion for writing while working as a call center agent where he had the idea for Plus 234, a series released in 2015. He has been called the "King of Web Series" for writing popular webs series including My Name is Azed S2, Rumour Has It, Skinny Girl in Transit, Phases, Game On, and Oga! Pastor (which he also created). He wrote the film screenplay for 2016's Just Not Married which was selected for city-to-city viewing at the 2016 Toronto International Film Festival (TIFF). In 2020 he launched the YouTube web series My Birthing Experience which he also produces.

Aisida currently works as Head of Content Development at Ndani TV Communications. He was a finalist for the Best of Nollywood Award for Best Screenplay for Just Not Married.

Filmography

Films

Television

Web series

References

External links
 
 

1984 births
Living people
Nigerian screenwriters
People from Lagos State
Nigerian YouTubers
Alumni of Oxford Brookes University
University of Lagos alumni